The 38th Army Corps was an Army corps in the Imperial Russian Army.

Part of
The corps was part of the following units during its existence:
13th Army (from 24 July 1915)
1st Army (12 August1 September 1915)
10th Army (18 September 1915December 1917)

Commanders
The corps was commanded by the following officers:
Lieutenant General Vasily Artemyev (8 June 191531 October 1916)
Lieutenant General Mikhail Sokovnin (31 October 191622 April 1917)
Lieutenant General Józef Dowbor-Muśnicki (28 April23 August 1917)
Lieutenant General Alexander Dobryshin (from 23 August 1917)

References

Citations

Bibliography
 
 

Corps of the Russian Empire